The Nguyễn dynasty (chữ Nôm: 茹阮, ; chữ Hán: 阮朝) was the last Vietnamese dynasty, which ruled the unified Vietnamese state largely independently from 1802 to 1883. During its existence, the empire expanded into modern-day southern Vietnam, Cambodia, and Laos through a continuation of the centuries-long Nam tiến and Siamese–Vietnamese wars. After 1883, the Nguyễn emperors ruled nominally as heads of state of the French protectorates of Annam and Tonkin until the final months of WWII; they later nominally ruled over the Empire of Vietnam until the August Revolution.

The Nguyễn Phúc family established feudal rule over large amounts of territory as the Nguyễn lords by the 16th century before defeating the Tây Sơn dynasty and establishing their own imperial rule in the 19th century. The dynastic rule began with Gia Long ascending the throne in 1802, after ending the previous Tây Sơn dynasty. The Nguyễn dynasty was gradually absorbed by France over the course of several decades in the latter half of the 19th century, beginning with the Cochinchina Campaign in 1858 which led to the occupation of the southern area of Vietnam. A series of unequal treaties followed; the occupied territory became the French colony of Cochinchina in the 1862 Treaty of Saigon, and the 1863 Treaty of Huế gave France access to Vietnamese ports and increased control of its foreign affairs. Finally, the 1883 and 1884 Treaties of Huế divided the remaining Vietnamese territory into the protectorates of Annam and Tonkin under nominal Nguyễn Phúc rule. In 1887, Cochinchina, Annam, Tonkin, and the French Protectorate of Cambodia were grouped together to form French Indochina.

The Nguyễn dynasty remained the formal emperors of Annam and Tonkin within Indochina until World War II. Japan had occupied Indochina with French collaboration in 1940, but as the war seemed increasingly lost, overthrew the French administration in March 1945 and proclaimed independence for its constituent countries. The Empire of Vietnam under Emperor Bảo Đại was a nominally independent Japanese puppet state during the last months of the war. It ended with Bảo Đại's abdication following the surrender of Japan and August Revolution by the anti-colonial Việt Minh in the August 1945. This ended the 143-year rule of the Nguyễn dynasty.

Names

Việt Nam 

The term "" (Yue) in Early Middle Chinese was first written using the logograph "戉" for an axe (a homophone), in oracle bone and bronze inscriptions of the late Shang dynasty ( BC), and later as "越". At that time it referred to a people or chieftain to the northwest of the Shang. In the early eighth century BC, a tribe on the middle Yangtze were called the Yangyue, a term later used for peoples further south. Between the seventh and fourth centuries BC Yue/Việt referred to the State of Yue in the lower Yangtze basin and its people. From the third century BC the term was used for the non-Chinese populations of south and southwest China and northern Vietnam, with particular ethnic groups called Minyue, Ouyue, Luoyue (Vietnamese: Lạc Việt), etc., collectively called the Baiyue (Bách Việt,). The term Baiyue/Bách Việt first appeared in the book Lüshi Chunqiu compiled around 239 BC. By the seventeenth and eighteenth centuries, educated Vietnamese called themselves and their people as người Việt and người Nam, which combined to become người Việt Nam (Vietnamese people). However, this designation was for the Vietnamese themselves and not for the whole country.

The form  is first recorded in the 16th-century oracular poem Sấm Trạng Trình. The name has also been found on 12 steles carved in the 16th and 17th centuries, including one at Bao Lam Pagoda in Hải Phòng that dates to 1558. In 1802, Nguyễn Phúc Ánh (who later became Emperor Gia Long) established the Nguyễn dynasty. In the second year of his rule, he asked the Jiaqing Emperor of the Qing dynasty to confer on him the title 'King of Nam Việt / Nanyue' ( in Chinese character) after seizing power in Annam. The Emperor refused because the name was related to Zhao Tuo's Nanyue, which included the regions of Guangxi and Guangdong in southern China. The Qing Emperor, therefore, decided to call the area "Việt Nam" instead. Between 1804 and 1813, the name Vietnam was used officially by Emperor Gia Long.

Đại Nam 

In 1839, under the rule of Emperor Minh Mạng's, official name of the empire was Đại Việt Nam (大越南, which means "Great Vietnam"), and it was shortened to Đại Nam (大南, which means "Great South").

Nam Triều 

During the 1930s its government used the name Nam Triều (南朝, Southern dynasty) on its official documents.

Other names 

Westerners in the past often called the kingdom as Annam or the Annamite Empire. However, in Vietnamese historiography, modern historians often refer to this period in Vietnamese history as Nguyễn Vietnam, alternatively spelled as Nguyễn Vietnam, or simply Vietnam to distinguish with the pre-19th century Đại Việt kingdom.

History

Background and establishment

Origin of Nguyễn clan 

The Nguyễn family clan, originated in the Thanh Hóa Province, exerted substantial political influence and military power, in particular throughout early modern Vietnamese history. Affiliations with the ruling elite date back to the tenth century when Nguyễn Bặc was appointed the first Grand Chancellor of the short-lived Đinh dynasty under Đinh Bộ Lĩnh in 965. Nguyễn Thị Anh, a queen consort of emperor Lê Thái Tông served as official regent of Đại Việt for her son emperor Lê Nhân Tông between 1442 and 1453.

Lê dynasty's servants
In 1527 Mạc Đăng Dung, after defeating and executing the Lê dynasty's vassal (Nguyễn Hoằng Dụ) in a rebellion and emerged as the intermediate victor and established the Mạc dynasty by deposing Emperor Lê Cung Hoàng of the once prosperous but rapidly declining later Lê dynasty. Nguyễn Hoằng Dụ's son Nguyễn Kim and his Trịnh clan allies remained loyal to the Lê dynasty and attempted to restore the Lê dynasty to power, thereby reigniting the rebellion. After that, both the Trịnh and Nguyễn clan again took up arms in Thanh Hóa province and revolted against the Mạc. However the rebellion was failed and they fled to kingdom of Lan Xang where the king Photisarath allows them to establish the exiled government in Xam Neua. The Lê loyalists under Lê Ninh, a descendant of the imperial family, escaped to Muang Phuan (today Laos). During exile, Marquis of An Thanh, Nguyễn Kim summoned the people who were still loyal to the Lê emperor and formed a new army to begin a revolt against Mạc Đăng Dung. In 1540, they return to  Đại Việt and begin their first military campaign against Mạc dynasty in Thanh Hóa province and capture the province in 1543.

Nguyễn's dominion in the south

Lê dynasty was restored in 1539 after the alliance recaptured Thanh Hoa Province and reinstall the Lê emperor Lê Trang Tông in throne. Nguyễn Kim, who had served as leader of the alliance during the 12 year of Lê–Mạc War (from 1533 to 1545) in the period of Northern and Southern dynasties, was assassinated in 1545 by a captured Mạc general (Dương Chấp Nhất). After that, Kim's son-in-law, Trịnh Kiểm who had killed the eldest son of Kim (Nguyễn Uông), then seize control of the alliance. The sixth son of Kim, Nguyễn Hoàng fears that his fate will be like his brother; therefore, he tried to run away from the capital to avoid the next assassination. Later, he asks his sister Nguyễn Thị Ngọc Bảo (wife of Trịnh Kiểm) to ask Kiểm to appoint him to be the governor of far-south frontier of Đại Việt, Thuận Hóa (modern Quảng Bình to Quảng Nam provinces). Trịnh Kiểm thought this was the opportunity to  remove the power and influence of Nguyễn Hoàng in the capital city so he agreed with the proposal. In 1558, Lê Anh Tông, emperor of the re-established Lê dynasty appointed Nguyễn Hoàng with the lordship of the Thuận Hóa, which had been conquered during the 15th century from the Champa kingdom. This event marked the beginning of division of two powerful families in 1558, Trịnh clan rules as dictatorship in the government of Lê dynasty in the north Đại Việt (Đàng Ngoài) and Nguyễn clan rules the South Đại Việt (Đàng Trong).

Nguyễn Phúc Lan chose the city of Phú Xuân in 1636 as his residence and established the dominion of the Nguyễn lord in the southern part of the country. Although the Nguyễn and Trịnh lords ruled as de facto rulers in their respective lands, they paid official tribute to the Lê emperors in a ceremonial gesture, and recognize Lê dynasty as the legitimacy of Đại Việt.

Nguyễn-Trịnh confrontation

Nguyễn Hoàng and his successors started to engage in rivalry with the Trịnh lords, after refusing to pay tax and tribute to the central government in Hanoi as Nguyễn lords tried to create the autonomous regime. They expanded their territory by making parts of Cambodia as protectorate, invaded Laos, captured the last vestiges of Champa in 1693 and ruled in an unbroken line until 1776.

Tây Sơn–Nguyễn war (1771–1802)

The end of the Nguyễn lords' reign

The 17th-century war between the Trịnh and the Nguyễn ended in an uneasy peace, with the two sides creating de facto separate states although both professed loyalty to the same Lê dynasty. After 100 years of domestic peace, the Nguyễn lords were confronted with the Tây Sơn rebellion in 1774. Its military had had considerable losses in manpower after a series of campaigns in Cambodia and proved unable to contain the revolt. By the end of the year, the Trịnh lords had formed an alliance with the Tây Sơn rebels and captured Huế in 1775.

Nguyễn lord, Nguyễn Phúc Thuần fled south to the Quảng Nam province, where he left a garrison under co-ruler Nguyễn Phúc Dương. He fled further south to the Gia Định Province (around modern-day Ho Chi Minh City) by sea before the arrival of Tây Sơn leader Nguyễn Nhạc, whose forces defeated the Nguyễn garrison and seized Quảng Nam.

In early 1777 a large Tây Sơn force under Nguyễn Huệ and Nguyễn Lữ attacked and captured Gia Định from the sea and defeated the Nguyễn Lord forces. The Tây Sơn received widespread popular support as they presented themselves as champions of the Vietnamese people, who rejected any foreign influence and fought for the full reinstitution of the Lê dynasty. Hence, the elimination of the Nguyễn and Trinh lordships was considered a priority and all but one member of the Nguyễn family captured at Saigon were executed.

Nguyễn Ánh escapes
In 1775, the 13-year-old Nguyễn Ánh escaped and with the help of the Vietnamese Catholic priest Paul Hồ Văn Nghị soon arrived at the Paris Foreign Missions Society in Hà Tiên. With Tây Son search parties closing in, he kept on moving and eventually met the French missionary Pigneau de Behaine. By retreating to the Thổ Chu Islands in the Gulf of Thailand, both escaped Tây Sơn capture.

Pigneau de Behaine decided to support Ánh, who had declared himself heir to the Nguyễn lordship. A month later the Tây Sơn army under Nguyễn Huệ had returned to Quy Nhơn. Ánh seized the opportunity and quickly raised an army at his new base in Long Xuyên, marched to Gia Định and occupied the city in December 1777. The Tây Sơn returned to Gia Định in February 1778 and recaptured the province. When Ánh approached with his army, the Tây Sơn retreated.

By the summer of 1781, Ánh's forces had grown to 30,000 soldiers, 80 battleships, three large ships and two Portuguese ships procured with the help of de Behaine. Ánh organized an unsuccessful ambush of the Tây Sơn base camps in the Phú Yên province. In March 1782 the Tây Sơn emperor Thái Đức and his brother Nguyễn Huệ sent a naval force to attack Ánh. Ánh's army was defeated and he fled via Ba Giồng to Svay Rieng in Cambodia.

Nguyễn–Cambodian agreement 
Ánh met with the Cambodian King Ang Eng, who granted him exile and offered support in his struggle with the Tây Sơn. In April 1782 a Tây Sơn army invaded Cambodia, detained and forced Ang Eng to pay tribute, and demanded, that all Vietnamese nationals living in Cambodia were to return to Vietnam.

Chinese Vietnamese support for Nguyễn Ánh 

Support by the Chinese Vietnamese began when the Qing dynasty overthrew the Ming dynasty. The Han Chinese refused to live under the Manchu Qing and fled to Southeast Asia (including Vietnam). Most were welcomed by the Nguyễn lords to resettle in southern Vietnam and set up business and trade.

In 1782, Nguyễn Ánh escaped to Cambodia and the Tây Sơn seized southern Vietnam (now Cochinchina). They had discriminated against the ethnic Chinese, displeasing the Chinese-Vietnamese. That April, Nguyễn loyalists Tôn Thất Dụ, Trần Xuân Trạch, Trần Văn Tự and Trần Công Chương sent military support to Ánh. The Nguyễn army killed grand admiral Phạm Ngạn, who had a close relationship with the Emperor Thái Đức, at Tham Lương bridge. Thái Đức, angry, thought that the ethnic Chinese had collaborated in the killing. He sacked the town of Cù lao (present-day Biên Hòa), which had a large Chinese population, and ordered the oppression of the Chinese community to avenge their assistance to Ánh. Ethnic cleansing had previously occurred in Hoi An, leading to support by wealthy Chinese for Ánh. He returned to Giồng Lữ, defeated Admiral Nguyễn Học of the Tây Sơn and captured eighty battleships. Ánh then began a campaign to reclaim southern Vietnam, but Nguyễn Huệ deployed a naval force to the river and destroyed his navy. Ánh again escaped with his followers to Hậu Giang. Cambodia later cooperated with the Tây Sơn to destroy Ánh's force and made him retreat to Rạch Giá, then to Hà Tiên and Phú Quốc.

Nguyễn – Siam alliance

Following consecutive losses to the Tây Sơn, Ánh sent his general Châu Văn Tiếp to Siam to request military assistance. Siam, under Chakri rule, wanted to conquer Cambodia and southern Vietnam. King Rama I agreed to ally with the Nguyễn lord and intervene militarily in Vietnam. Châu Văn Tiếp sent a secret letter to Ánh about the alliance. After meeting with Siamese generals at Cà Mau, Ánh, thirty officials and some troops visited Bangkok to meet Rama I in May 1784. The governor of Gia Định Province, Nguyễn Văn Thành, advised Ánh against foreign assistance.

Rama I, fearing the growing influence of the Tây Sơn dynasty in Cambodia and Laos, decided to dispatch his army against it. In Bangkok, Ánh began to recruit Vietnamese refugees in Siam to join his army (which totaled over 9,000). He returned to Vietnam and prepared his forces for the Tây Sơn campaign in June 1784, after which he captured Gia Định. Rama I nominated his nephew, Chiêu Tăng, as admiral the following month. The admiral led Siamese forces including 20,000 marine troops and 300 warships from the Gulf of Siam to Kiên Giang Province. In addition, more than 30,000 Siamese infantry troops crossed the Cambodian border to An Giang Province. On 25 November 1784, Admiral Châu Văn Tiếp died in battle against the Tây Sơn in Mang Thít District, Vĩnh Long Province. The alliance was largely victorious from July through November, and the Tây Sơn army retreated north. However, Emperor Nguyễn Huệ halted the retreat and counter-attacked the Siamese forces in December. In the decisive battle of Rạch Gầm–Xoài Mút, more than 20,000 Siamese soldiers died and the remainder retreated to Siam.

Ánh, disillusioned with Siam, escaped to Thổ Chu Island in April 1785 and then to Ko Kut Island in Thailand. The Siamese army escorted him back to Bangkok, and he was briefly exiled in Thailand.

French assistance 

The war between the Nguyễn lord and the Tây Sơn dynasty forced Ánh to find more allies. His relationship with de Behaine improved, and support for an alliance with France increased. Before the request for Siamese military assistance, de Behaine was in Chanthaburi and Ánh asked him to come to Phú Quốc Island. Ánh asked him to contact King Louis XVI of France for assistance; de Behaine agreed to coordinate an alliance between France and Vietnam, and Ánh gave him a letter to present at the French court. Ánh's oldest son, Nguyễn Phúc Cảnh, was chosen to accompany de Behaine. Due to inclement weather, the voyage was postponed until December 1784. The group departed from Phú Quốc Island for Malacca and thence to Pondicherry, and Ánh moved his family to Bangkok. The group arrived in Lorient in February 1787, and Louis XVI agreed to meet them in May.

On 28 November 1787, de Behaine signed the Treaty of Versailles with French Minister of Foreign Affairs Armand Marc at the Palace of Versailles on behalf of Nguyễn Ánh. The treaty stipulated that France provide four frigates, 1,200 infantry troops, 200 artillery, 250 cafres (African soldiers), and other equipment. Nguyễn Ánh ceded the Đà Nẵng estuary and Côn Sơn Island to France. The French were allowed to trade freely and control foreign trade in Vietnam. Vietnam had to build one ship per year which was similar to the French ship which brought aid and give it to France. Vietnam was obligated to supply food and other aid to France when the French were at war with other East Asian nations.

On 27 December 1787, Pigneau de Behaine and Nguyễn Phúc Cảnh left France for Pondicherry to wait for the military support promised by the treaty. However, due to the French Revolution and the abolition of the French monarchy, the treaty was never executed. Thomas Conway, who was responsible for French assistance, refused to provide it. Although the treaty was not implemented, de Behaine recruited French businessman who intended to trade in Vietnam and raised funds to assist Nguyễn Ánh. He spent fifteen thousand francs of his own money to purchase guns and warships. Cảnh and de Behaine returned to Gia Định in 1788 (after Nguyễn Ánh had recaptured it), followed by a ship with the war materiel. Frenchmen who were recruited included Jean-Baptiste Chaigneau, Philippe Vannier, Olivier de Puymanel, and Jean-Marie Dayot. A total of twenty people joined Ánh's army. The French purchased and supplied equipment and weaponry, reinforcing the defense of Gia Định, Vĩnh Long, Châu Đốc, Hà Tiên, Biên Hòa, Bà Rịa and training Ánh's artillery and infantry according to the European model.

Qing China - Lê alliance against Tây Sơn

In 1786, Nguyễn Huệ led the army against the Trịnh lords; Trịnh Khải escaped to the north but got captured by the local people. He then committed suicide. After the Tây Sơn army returned to Quy Nhơn, subjects of the Trịnh lord restored Trịnh Bồng (son of Trịnh Giang) as the next lord. Lê Chiêu Thống, emperor of the Lê dynasty, wanted to regain power from the Trịnh. He summoned Nguyễn Hữu Chỉnh, governor of Nghệ An, to attack the Trịnh lord at the Imperial Citadel of Thăng Long. Trịnh Bồng surrendered to the Lê and became a monk. Nguyễn Hữu Chỉnh wanted to unify the country under Lê rule, and began to prepare the army to march south and attack the Tây Sơn. Huệ led the army, killed Nguyễn Hữu Chỉnh, and captured the later Lê capital. The Lê imperial family were exiled to China, and the later Lê dynasty collapsed.

At that time, Nguyễn Huệ's influence became stronger in northern Vietnam; this made Emperor Nguyễn Nhạc of the Tây Sơn dynasty suspect Huệ's loyalty. The relationship between the brothers became tense, eventually leading to battle. Huệ had his army surround Nhạc's capital, at Quy Nhơn citadel, in 1787. Nhạc begged Huệ not to kill him, and they reconciled. In 1788, Lê emperor Lê Chiêu Thống fled to China and asked for military assistance. Qing emperor Qianlong ordered Sun Shiyi to lead the military campaign into Vietnam. The campaign failed, diplomatic relations with Vietnam were normalized, and the Tây Sơn dynasty began to weaken.

Franco-Nguyễn alliance against Tây Sơn

Nguyễn Ánh's counter-attack 
Ánh began to reorganize a strong armed force in Siam. He left Siam (after thanking King Rama I), and returned to Vietnam. During the 1787 war between Nguyễn Huệ and Nguyễn Nhạc in northern Vietnam, Ánh recaptured the southern Vietnamese capital of Gia Định. Southern Vietnam had been ruled by the Nguyễns and they remained popular, especially with the ethnic Chinese. Nguyễn Lữ, the youngest brother of Tây Sơn (who ruled southern Vietnam), could not defend the citadel and retreated to Quy Nhơn. The citadel of Gia Định was seized by the Nguyễn lords.
In 1788 de Behaine and Ánh's son, Prince Cảnh, arrived in Gia Định with modern war equipment and more than twenty Frenchmen who wanted to join the army. The force was trained and strengthened with French assistance.

Defeat of the Tây Sơn 

After the fall of the citadel at Gia Định, Nguyễn Huệ prepared an expedition to reclaim it before his death on 16 September 1792. His young son, Nguyễn Quang Toản, succeeded him as emperor of the Tây Sơn and was a poor leader. In 1793, Nguyễn Ánh began a campaign against Quang Toản. Due to conflict between officials of the Tây Sơn court, Quang Toản lost battle after battle. In 1797, Ánh and Nguyễn Phúc Cảnh attacked Qui Nhơn (then in Phú Yên Province) in the Battle of Thị Nại. They were victorious, capturing a large amount of Tây Sơn equipment. Quang Toản became unpopular due to his murders of generals and officials, leading to a decline in the army. In 1799, Ánh captured the citadel of Quy Nhơn. He seized the capital (Phú Xuân) on 3 May 1801, and Quang Toản retreated north. On 20 July 1802, Ánh captured Hanoi and end the Tây Sơn dynasty, all of the members of the Tây Sơn was captured. Ánh then executed all the members of the Tây Sơn dynasty that year.

Imperial rule (1802–1883)

Overview 

In Vietnamese historiography, the independent period is referred to as the Nhà Nguyễn thời độc lập period. During this period the Nguyễn dynasty's territories comprised the present-day territories of Vietnam and parts of modern Cambodia and Laos, bordering Siam to the west and Manchu Qing dynasty to the north. The ruling Nguyễn emperors established and ran the first well-defined imperial administrative and bureaucratic system of Vietnam and annexed Cambodia and Champa into its territories in the 1830s. Together with Chakri Siam and Konbaung Burma, it was one among three major Southeast Asian powers at the time. The emperor Gia Long was relatively friendly toward Western powers and Christianity. After his reign that of Minh Mạng brought a new approach, he ruled for 21 years from 1820 to 1841, as a conservative and Confucian ruler; introducing a policy of isolationism which kept the country from the rest of the world for nearly 40 years until the French invasion in 1858. Minh Mạng tightened control over Catholicism, Muslim, and ethnic minorities, resulting in more than two hundred rebellions across the country during his twenty-one-year reign. He also further expanded Vietnamese imperialism in modern-day Laos and Cambodia.

Minh Mạng's successors, Thiệu Trị (r. 1841–1847) and Tự Đức (r. 1847–1883) would be assailed by serious problems that ultimately decimated the Vietnamese state. In the late 1840s, Vietnam was struck by the global cholera pandemic that killed roughly 8% of the country's population, while the countries isolationist policies damaged the economy. France and Spain declared war on Vietnam in September 1858. Faced with these industrialised powers, the hermit Nguyễn dynasty and its military crumbled, the alliance capturing Saigon in early 1859. A series of unequal treaties followed with first the 1862 Treaty of Saigon, and then the 1863 Treaty of Huế which gave France access to Vietnamese ports and increased control of its foreign affairs. The Treaty of Saigon (1874) concluded the French annexation of Cochinchina that had begun in 1862.

The last independent Nguyễn emperor of note was Tự Đức. Upon his death a succession crisis followed, as the regent Tôn Thất Thuyết orchestrated the murders of three emperors in a year. This presented an opportunity to the French. The Huế court was forced to sign the Harmand Convention in September 1883, which formalised the handover of Tonkin to the French administration. After the Treaty of Patenôtre was signed in 1884, France finished its annexation and partitioning of Vietnam into three constituent protectorates of French Indochina, and turned the Nguyễn into a vassal monarchy. Finally, the Treaty of Tientsin (1885) between the Chinese Empire and the French Republic was signed on 9 June 1885 recognising French dominion over Vietnam. All emperors after Đồng Khánh were chosen by the French, and only ruled symbolically.

Gia Long period 
Nguyễn Phúc Ánh united Vietnam after a three-hundred-year division of the country. He celebrated his coronation at Huế on 1 June 1802 and proclaimed himself emperor, with the era name Gia Long (嘉隆). This title emphasized his rule from "Gia" Định region (modern-day Saigon) in the far south to Thăng "Long" (modern-day Hanoi) in the north. Gia Long prioritized the nation's defense and worked to avoid another civil war. He replaced the feudal system with a reformist Doctrine of the Mean, based on Confucianism. The Nguyen dynasty was founded as a tributary state of the Qing Empire, with Gia Long receiving an imperial pardon and recognition as the ruler of Vietnam from the Jiaqing Emperor for recognizing Chinese suzerainty. The envoys sent to China to acquire this recognition cited the ancient kingdom of Nanyue (Vietnamese: Nam Việt) to Emperor Jiaqing as the countries name, this displeased the emperor who was disconcerted by such pretentions, and Nguyễn Phúc Ánh had to officially rename his kingdom as Vietnam the next year to satisfy the emperor. The country was officially known as 'The (Great) Vietnamese state' (Vietnamese: Đại Việt Nam quốc),

Gia Long asserted that he was reviving the bureaucratic state that was built by King Lê Thánh Tông during the fifteenth-century golden age (1470–1497), as such he adopted a Confucian-bureaucratic government model, and sought unification with northern literati. To ensure stability over the unified kingdom, he placed two of his most loyal and Confucian-educated advisors, Nguyễn Văn Thành and Lê Văn Duyệt as viceroys of Hanoi and Saigon. From 1780 to 1820, roughly 300 Frenchmen served Gia Long's court as officials. Seeing the French influence in Vietnam with alarm, the British Empire sent two envoys to Gia Long in 1803 and 1804 to convince him to abandon his friendship with the French. In 1808, a British fleet led by William O'Bryen Drury mounted an attack on the Red River Delta, but was soon driven back by the Vietnamese navy and suffered several losses. After the Napoleonic war and Gia Long's death, the British Empire renewed relation with Vietnam in 1822. During his reign, a system of road connecting Hanoi, Hue, and Saigon with postal stations and inns was established, several canals connecting the Mekong River to the Gulf of Siam were constructed and finished. In 1812, Gia Long issued the Gia Long Code, which was instituted based on the Ch'ing Code of China, replaced the previous Thánh Tông's 1480 Code. In 1811, a coup d'état broke out in the Kingdom of Cambodia, a Vietnamese tributary state, forcing the pro-Vietnamese King Ang Chan II to seek support from Vietnam. Gia Long sent 13,000 men to Cambodia, successfully restoring his vassal to his throne, and beginning a more formal occupation of the country for the next 30 years, while Siam seized northern Cambodia in 1814.

Gia Long died in 1819 and was succeeded by his fourth son, Nguyễn Phúc Đảm, who soon became known as Emperor Minh Mạng (r. 1820–1841) of Vietnam.

Rise and expansion under Minh Mạng 

Minh Mạng was the younger brother of prince Nguyễn Phúc Cảnh and fourth son of Emperor Gia Long. Educated in Confucian principles from youth, Minh Mạng became the Emperor of Vietnam in 1820, during a deadly cholera outbreak that ravaged and killed 200,000 people across the country. His reign mainly focused on centralizing and stabilizing the state, by abolishing the Viceroy system and implementing a new full bureaucracy-provincial-based administration. He also halted diplomacy with Europe, and cracked down on religious minorities.

Minh Mạng  shunned relations with the European powers. By 1824, after the death of Jean Marie Despiau, no Western advisors who had served Gia Long remained in Minh Mạng's court. The last French consul of Vietnam, Eugene Chaigneau, was never able to obtain audience with Minh Mạng. After he left, France ceased attempts at contact. In the next year he launched an anti-Catholicism propaganda campaign, denouncing the religion as "vicious" and full of "false teaching." In 1832 Minh Mạng turned the Cham Principality of Thuận Thành into a Vietnamese province, the final conquest in a long history of colonial conflict between Cham and Vietnam. He coercively fed lizard and pig meat to Cham Muslims and cow meat to Cham Hindus in violation of their religions to forcibly assimilate them to Vietnamese culture. The first Cham revolt for independence took place in 1833–1834 when Katip Sumat, a Cham mullah who had just returned to Vietnam from Mecca declared a holy war (jihad) against the Vietnamese emperor. The rebellion failed to gain the support of the Cham elite and was quickly suppressed by the Vietnamese military. A second revolt began the following year, led by a Muslim clergy named Ja Thak with supports from the old Cham royalty, highland people, and Vietnamese dissents. Minh Mạng mercilessly crushed the Ja Thak rebellion and executed the last Cham ruler Po Phaok The in early 1835.

In 1833, as Minh Mạng had been trying to take firm control over the six southern provinces, a large rebellion led by Lê Văn Khôi (an adopted son of the Saigon viceroy Lê Văn Duyệt) broke out in Saigon, attempting to place Minh Mang's brother Prince Cảnh on the throne. The rebellion lasted for two years, gathering much support from Vietnamese Catholics, Khmers, Chinese merchants in Saigon, and even the Siamese ruler Rama III until it was crushed by the government forces in 1835. In January, he issued the first country-wide prohibition of Catholicism, and began persecuting Christians. 130 Christian missionaries, priests and church leaders were executed, dozens of churches were burned and destroyed.

War with Siam and invasion of Cambodia 

Minh Mạng also expanded his empire westward, putting central and southern Laos under Cam Lộ Province, and collided with his father's former ally-Siam in Vientiane and Cambodia. He backed the revolt of Laotian king Anouvong of Vientiane against the Siamese, and seized Xam Neua and Savannakhet in 1827.

In 1834, the Vietnamese Crown fully annexed Cambodia and renamed it to Tây Thành Province. Minh Mạng placed the general Trương Minh Giảng as the governor of the Cambodian province, expanding his forcible religious assimilation to the new territory. King Ang Chan II of Cambodia died in the next year and Ming Mang installed Chan's daughter Ang Mey as Commandery Princess of Cambodia. Cambodian officials were required to wear Vietnamese-style clothing, and govern in Vietnamese style. However the Vietnamese rule over Cambodia did not last long and proved draining to Vietnams economy to maintain. Minh Mạng died in 1841, whilst a Khmer uprising was in progress with Siamese support, putting an end to the Tây Thành province and Vietnamese control of Cambodia.

Decline of the Nguyễn dynasty 

Over the next forty years, Vietnam was ruled by two further independent emperors Thiệu Trị (r. 1841–1847) and Tự Đức (r. 1848–1883). Thiệu Trị or Prince Miên Tông, was the eldest son of Emperor Minh Mạng. His six-year reign showed a significant decrease in Catholic persecution. With the population growing fast from 6 million in the 1820s to 10 million in 1850, the attempts at agricultural self sufficiency were proving unworkable.  Between 1802 and 1862, the court had faced 405 minor and large revolts of peasants, political dissents, ethnic minorities, Lê loyalists (people that were loyal to the old Lê Duy dynasty) across the country, this made responding to the challenge of European colonisers significantly more challenging.

In 1845, the American warship USS Constitution landed in Đà Nẵng, taking all local officials hostage with the demands that Thiệu Trị free imprisoned French bishop Dominique Lefèbvre. In 1847, Thiệu Trị had made peace with Siam, but the imprisonment of Dominique Lefebvre offered an excuse for French and British aggression. In April the French navy attacked the Vietnamese and sank many Vietnamese ships in Đà Nẵng, demanding the release of Lefèbvre. Angered by the incident, Thiệu Trị ordered all European documents in his palace to be smashed, and all European caught on Vietnamese land were to immediate execution. In autumn, two British warships of Sir John Davis arrived in Đà Nẵng and attempted to force a commercial treaty on Vietnam, but the emperor refused. He died a few days later of apoplexy.

Tự Đức, or Prince Hồng Nhậm was Thiệu Trị's youngest son, well-educated in Confucian learning, he was crowned by minister and co-regent Trương Đăng Quế. Prince Hồng Bảo-the elder brother of Tự Đức, the primogeniture heir rebelled against Tự Đức on the day of his accession. This coup failed but he was spared execution on the intervention of Từ Dụ, with his sentence being reduced to life imprisonment. Aware of the rise of Western influences in Asia, Tự Đức confirmed his grandfathers isolationist policy towards the European powers, prohibiting embassies, forbidding trade and contact with foreigners and renewing the persecution of Catholics his grandfather had orchestrated. During Tự Đức's first twelve years, Vietnamese Catholics faced harsh persecution with 27 European missionaries, 300 Vietnamese priests and bishops, and 30,000 Vietnamese Christians executed and crucified from 1848 to 1860.

In the late 1840s, another cholera outbreak hit Vietnam, having travelled from India. The epidemic quickly spread out of control and killed 800,000 people (8%–10% of Vietnam's 1847 population) across the Empire. Locusts plagued northern Vietnam in 1854, and a major rebellion in the following year damaged much of the Tonkin countryside. These various crises weakened the empires control over Tonkin considerably.

In the 1850-1870s, a new class of liberal intellectuals emerged in the court as persecution relaxed, many of them Catholics who had studied abroad in Europe, most notably Nguyễn Trường Tộ, who urged the emperor to reform and transform the Empire following the Western model and open Vietnam to the west. Despite their efforts the conservative Confucian bureaucrats and Tự Đức himself had literal interest in such reforms. The economy remained largely agricultural, with 95% of the population living in rural areas, only mining offered potential to the modernists dreams of a western style state.

French conquest 

In September 1858, Napoleon III orchestrated a Franco-Spanish army bombardment and invaded Đà Nẵng to protest against the executions of two Spanish Dominican missionaries. Seven months later, they sailed to the south to attack Saigon and the rich Mekong Delta. The Alliance troops held Saigon for two years, while a rebellion of Lê loyalists led by Catholic bishop Pedro Tạ Văn Phụng, who proclaimed himself to be a Lê prince, broke out in the north and escalated. Alongside the pretext of avenging the death of the missionaries the French invasion was designed to prove to Europe that France wasn't a second rate power, and 'civilise' the area.  February 1861, French reinforcement and 70 warships led by General Vassoigne arrived and overwhelmed the Vietnamese strongholds. Facing the Alliance invasion and internal rebellion, Tự Đức chose to cede three Southern provinces to France in order to deal with the coinciding rebellion.

In June 1862, the Treaty of Saigon was signed, resulting in Vietnam losing three southern provinces; Gia Định, Mỹ Tho, Biên Hòa which became the basis of French Cochinchina. In the Treaty of Huế (1863) the island of Poulo Condoræ would allow Catholicism, three ports would be open to French trade, and the sea opened to allow French expansion into Kampuchea. and war reparations were required to be sent to France. Despite the religious elements of this treaty, France would not intervene in the Christian revolt in Northern Vietnam, even with their missionaries urging them to. To the Queen dowager, Từ Dụ, the court, and the people, the 1862 treaty was a national humiliation. Tự Đức once again sent a mission to French Emperor Napoleon III, in which he called to revise the 1862 treaty. In July 1864, another draft treaty was signed. France returned the three provinces to Vietnam, but still held control over three important cities Saigon, Mỹ Tho, and Thủ Dầu Một. In 1866, France convinced Tự Đức to hand over the southern provinces of Vĩnh Long, Hà Tiên, and Châu Đốc. Phan Thanh Giản, the governor of the three provinces immediately resigned. Without resistance, in 1867, the French annexed the provinces and turned their attention to the northern provinces.

By the late 1860s, pirates, bandits, remnants of the Taiping rebellion in China, fled to Tonkin and turned Northern Vietnam into a hotbed for their raid activities. The Vietnamese state was too weak to fight against the pirates. These Chinese rebels eventually formed their own mercenary armies as the Black Flags had done and cooperated with local Vietnamese officials to interfere with French business interests. As France was looking to acquire Yunnan and Tonkin, when in 1873, a French merchant-adventurer named Jean Dupuis was intercepted by local Hanoi authority, the French Cochinchina government responded by sending out a new attack without talking with the Hue court. A French army led by Francis Garnier arrived at Tonkin in November. Because local administrators had allied with the Black Flags and mistrusting of Hanoi governor Nguyễn Tri Phương, in late November the French and Lê loyalists opened fire at the Vietnamese citadel of Hanoi. Tự Đức immediately sent delegations to negotiate with Garnier, but Prince Hoàng Kế Viêm, governor of Sơn Tây, had enlisted the Chinese Black Flags militia of Liu Yongfu to attack the French. A peace negotiation between Vietnam and France was reached on 5 January 1874. France formally recognized Vietnam's full independence from China; France would pay off Vietnam's Spanish debts; French force returned Hanoi to the Vietnamese; the Vietnamese military in Hanoi had to disband and be reduced to a simple police force; total religious and trade freedom was ensured; Vietnam was compelled to recognise all six southern provinces as French territories.

End of independence (1874–1885) 

Just two years after French recognition, Tự Đức sent an embassy to Qing China in 1876 and re-provoked the tributary relationship with the Chinese (the last mission was in 1849). In 1878, Vietnam renewed relations with Thailand. In 1880, Britain, Germany, and Spain were still debating the fate of Vietnam, and the Chinese Embassy in Paris openly rejected the 1874 Franco-Vietnamese agreement. In Paris, Prime minister Jules Ferry proposed a direct military campaign against Vietnam to revise the 1874 treaty. Because Tự Đức was too preoccupied to keep the French out of his Empire without directly engaging against them, he requested assistance from the Chinese court. In 1882, 30,000 Qing troops flooded into the northern provinces and occupied cities. The Black Flags had also been returning, together, collaborating with local Vietnamese officials and harassing French businesses. In March, the French responded by sending a second expedition led by Henri Rivière to the north to deal with these various problems, but had to avoid all international attention, particularly from China. On 25 April 1882, Rivière took Hanoi without facing any resistance. Tự Đức informed the Chinese court that their tributary state was being attacked. In September 1882, 17 Chinese divisions (200,000 men) crossed the Sino-Vietnamese borders and occupied Lạng Sơn, Cao Bằng, Bac Ninh, and Thái Nguyên, under the pretext of defending against the French aggression.

Backed by the Chinese army and the prince Hoàng Kế Viêm, Liu Yongfu, and the Black Flags decided to attack Rivière. On 19 May 1883, the Black Flags ambushed and beheaded Rivière at the Second Battle of Cầu Giấy. When news of Rivière's death reached France, there was immediate outcry and demands for a response. The French Parliament quickly voted for the conquest of Vietnam. Tens of thousands of French and Chinese reinforcements poured into the Red River Delta.

Tự Đức died on 17 July. Succession trouble temporarily paralyzed the court. One of his nephews Nguyễn Phúc Ưng Ái was crowned as Emperor Dục Đức but was, however, imprisoned and executed after three days by the three powerful regents Nguyễn Văn Tường, Tôn Thất Thuyết and Tran Tien Thanh for unknown reasons. Tự Đức's brother Nguyễn Phúc Hồng Dật succeeded on 30 July as Emperor Hiệp Hòa. The senior Censorate official of the court Phan Đình Phùng denounced the three regents for their irregular handling of Tự Đức's succession. Tôn Thất Thuyết excoriated Phan Đình Phùng and sent him from the court to his home territory, where later he led a nationalist resistance movement against the French for ten years.

To knock Vietnam out of the war, France decided to take a direct assault on the city of Huế. The French army split up itself into two parts: the smaller under General Bouët stayed in Hanoi and waited for reinforcement from France while the French fleet led by Amédée Courbet and Jules Harmand sailed to Thuận An, the sea gate of Hue on August 17. Harmand demanded the two regents Nguyễn Văn Tường and Tôn Thất Thuyết surrender Northern Vietnam, North-Central Vietnam (Thanh Hoá, Nghệ An, Hà Tĩnh) and Bình Thuận Province to French possession, and to accept a French résident in Huế who could demand imperial audiences. He sent an ultimatum to the regents that "The name Vietnam will no longer exist in history" if they did not comply with this.

On 18 August, French battleships began shelling Vietnamese positions in the Thuận An citadel. Two days later, at dawn, Courbet and the French marines landed on the shore. By the next morning, all Vietnamese defenses in Huế were overwhelmed by the French. Emperor Hiệp Hòa dispatched mandarin Nguyễn Thượng Bắc to negotiate.

On 25 September, two court officials, Trần Đình Túc and Nguyễn Trọng Hợp signed a twenty-seven-article treaty known as Harmand Convention. The French were granted Bình Thuận; Đà Nẵng and Qui Nhơn were opened for trade; the ruling sphere of the Vietnamese monarchy was reduced to Central Vietnam while Northern Vietnam became a French Protectorate. In November, Emperor Hiệp Hòa and Trần Tiễn Thành were executed by Nguyễn Văn Tường and Tôn Thất Thuyết for their perceived pro-French sympathies. 14-year-old Nguyễn Phúc Ưng Đăng was crowned as Emperor Kiến Phúc. After achieving peace with China through the Tientsin Accord in May 1884, on 6 June the French Ambassador in China Jules Patenôtre des Noyers signed with Nguyen Van Tuong the Protectorate Treaty of Patenôtre, which confirmed French dominion over Vietnam. On 31 May 1885, France appointed the first governor of all Vietnam. On 9 June 1885, Vietnam ceased to exist after 83 years as an independent state. The leader of the pro-war faction, Tôn Thất Thuyết and his supporters revolted against the French in July 1885, but were forced to retreat to the Laotian highlands with the young emperor Hàm Nghi (Nguyễn Phúc Ưng Lịch.) Meanwhile the French installed his pro-French brother Nguyễn Phúc Ưng Kỷ as emperor Đồng Khánh. Thuyết called up the nobility, loyalists and nationalists to arm for the resistance against the French occupation (Cần Vương movement). The movement lasted for 11 years (1885–1896) and Thuyết was forced to exile in China in 1888.

French protectorates of Annam and Tonkin (1883–1945) 

The 1883 Treaty of Huế led to the rest of Vietnam becoming French protectorates, divided into the Protectorates of Annam and Tonkin. The terms were, however, considered overly harsh in French diplomatic circles and never ratified in France. The following 1884 Treaty of Huế provided a softened version of the previous treaty. The 1885 Treaty of Tientsin, which reaffirmed the 1884 Tientsin Accord and ended the Sino-French War, confirmed Vietnam's status as French protectorates and severed Vietnam's tributary relationship with the Qing dynasty by requiring that all of Vietnam's foreign affairs be conducted through France.

After this the Nguyễn dynasty only nominally ruled the two French protectorates. Annam and Tonkin were combined with Cochinchina and the neighboring Cambodian protectorate in 1887 to form the Union of French Indochina, of which they became administrative components.

French rule also added new ingredients to Vietnam's cultural stew: Catholicism and a Latin-based alphabet. The spelling used in the Vietnamese transliteration was Portuguese-based, because the French relied on a dictionary compiled earlier by a Portuguese cleric.

World War I 

While seeking to maximize the use of Indochina's natural resources and manpower to fight World War I, France cracked down on Vietnam's patriotic mass movements. Indochina (mainly Vietnam) had to provide France with 70,000 soldiers and 70,000 workers, who were forcibly drafted from villages to serve on the French battlefront. Vietnam also contributed 184 million piastres in loans and 336,000 tons of food.

These burdens proved heavy, since agriculture experienced natural disasters from 1914 to 1917.
Lacking a unified nationwide organization, the vigorous Vietnamese national movement failed to use the difficulties France had as a result of war to stage significant uprisings.

In May 1916, sixteen-year-old emperor Duy Tân escaped from his palace to participate in an uprising of Vietnamese troops. The French were informed of the plan, and its leaders were arrested and executed. Duy Tân was deposed and exiled to the island of Réunion in the Indian Ocean.

World War II 

Nationalist sentiment intensified in Vietnam (especially during and after the First World War), but uprisings and tentative efforts failed to obtain concessions from the French. The Russian Revolution greatly impacted 20th-century Vietnamese history.

For Vietnam, the outbreak of World War II on 1 September 1939 was as decisive as the 1858 French seizure of Đà Nẵng. The Axis power of Japan invaded Vietnam on 22 September 1940, attempting to construct military bases to strike against Allied forces in Southeast Asia. This led to a period of Indochina under Japanese occupation with cooperation of the collaborationist Vichy French, who still retained administration of the colony. During this time the Viet Minh, a communist resistance movement, developed under Ho Chi Minh from 1941, with allied support. During a 1944–1945 famine in northern Vietnam, over one million people starved to death.

Empire of Vietnam (1945) 

In March 1945, after the liberation of France and heavy setbacks in the war, the Japanese in a last ditch effort to gather support in Indochina overthrew the French administration, imprisoned their civil servants and proclaimed independence for Cambodia, Laos and Vietnam, which became the Empire of Vietnam with Bảo Đại as its Emperor. The Empire of Vietnam was a puppet state of the Empire of Japan. After the Surrender of Japan, Bảo Đại abdicated on 25 August 1945 while the Viet Minh launched the August Revolution.

This ended the 143-year reign of the Nguyễn dynasty.

National administration

Government

Emperor 
 

The Nguyễn dynasty retained the bureaucratic and hierarchic system of previous dynasties. The emperor was the head of state who wielded absolute authority. Under the emperor was the Ministry of Interior (which worked on papers, imperial messages and recording) and four Grand Secretariats, later renamed the Ministry of Secret Council.

The Emperor of the Nguyễn dynasty was an absolutist ruler, which means he was both the head of state and the head of government. The Gia Long Code in 1812 declared the Vietnamese monarch as the universal ruler of all Vietnam; using the Confucian concept Mandate of Heaven to provide monarchs absolute power. Their reign and popular images were judged based on how prosperous the livelihood (民生, dân sinh) of the people and the Confucian concept of chính danh (rectification of names), according to the Confucian biblical Analects, everything has to stay in its right order. Gia Long also perceived the ancient Chinese conception of Hua-Yi and in 1805 he confessed his Empire as Trung Quốc (中國, "the Middle Kingdom"), the Vietnamese term which often refers to China but now was taken by Gia Long to emphasis his Son of Heaven status and the devaluation of China. Following next decades, Confucianism and the Mandate of Heaven theory gradually lost their positions within the Vietnamese officials and intellectuals. When the fourth emperor, Tự Đức, ceded Southern Vietnam to France and called all Southern officials to give up arms, many ignored, disobeyed the Son of Heaven, and continued to fight against invaders. Many dissents viewed him as surrendering and frightened of France. Rebellions against Tự Đức erupted every year from 1860 until he died in 1883.

A dual theory of sovereignty existed in Vietnam. All the Nguyễn monarchs were addresses as hoàng đế (黃帝, Sino-Vietnamese title for "Emperor") in the court while referring himself the first person honorific trẫm (he who give the order). They also used the concept of thiên tử (天子, "Son of Heaven", which is borrowed from China) to demonstrate that the ruler was descended and commissioned by heaven to rule the kingdom. However, in most cases, Nguyen rulers were formally called vua (𪼀, the Vietnamese title for "monarch" or " sovereign ruler") by the ordinary Vietnamese folks. The concept of a divine Son of Heaven has not been dogmatically practiced, and the monarch's divinity was not absolute due to the dual theory. For example, Xu Jiyu, a Chinese geographer, reported that the bureaucrats in the Vietnamese court sat down and even felt free to search themselves for body lice during the court audiences. Gia Long once told the son of J. B. Chaigneau, one of his advisors, that the use of Son of Heaven in Vietnam was an "absurdity" and "at least in mixed Vietnamese-European Company." Once the young crown prince being chosen to succeed, his obligation was to be filial with parents, being well-educated in politics and classics, internalise the morals and ethics of a ruler.

After the 1884 Treaty of Huế was signed, the Nguyễn dynasty became two protectorates of France and the French installed their own administrators. Although the Emperors of the Nguyễn dynasty were still nominally in control of the protectorates of Annam and Tonkin, the Resident-Superior of Annam gradually gained more influence over the imperial court in Huế. In 1897 the Resident-Superior was granted the power to appoint the Nguyễn dynasty Emperors and presided over the meetings of the Viện cơ mật. These moves incorporated French officials directly into the administrative structure of the Imperial Huế Court and further legitimised French rule in the legislative branch of the Nguyễn government. From this period onwards any imperial edicts issued by the Emperors of Đại Nam had to be confirmed by the Resident-Superior of Annam giving him both legislative and executive power over the Nguyễn government.

In the year 1898 the federal government of French Indochina took over the financial and property management duties of the Nguyễn dynasty's imperial court meaning that the Nguyễn dynasty Emperor (at the time Thành Thái) became a salaried employee of the Indochinese colonial structure, reducing their power to being only a civil servant of the Protectorate government. The Resident-Superior of Annam also took over the management of provincial mandarins and was a member of the Supreme Council (Conseil supérieur) of the Government-General of French Indochina.

Civil service and bureaucracy

Taxes 

Vietnam's monetary subunit was the quan (貫). One quan equaled 10 coins, equivalent to ₫600. Officials received the following taxes:
 First senior rank (Chánh nhất phẩm): 400 quan; rice: 300 kg; per-capita tax: 70 quan
 First junior rank (Tòng nhất phẩm): 300 quan; rice: 250 kg; tax: 60 quan
 Second senior rank (Chánh nhị phẩm): 250 quan; rice: 200 kg; tax: 50 quan
 Second junior rank (Tòng nhị phẩm): 180 quan; rice: 150 kg; tax: 30 quan
 Third senior rank (Chánh tam phẩm): 150 quan; rice: 120 kg; tax: 20 quan
 Third junior rank (Tòng tam phẩm): 120 quan; rice: 90 kg; tax: 16 quan
 Fourth senior rank (Chánh tứ phẩm): 80 quan; rice: 60 kg; tax: 14 quan
 Fourth junior rank (Tòng tứ phẩm): 60 quan; rice: 50 kg; tax: 10 quan
 Fifth senior rank (Chánh ngũ phẩm): 40 quan; rice: 43 kg; tax: 9 quan
 Fifth junior rank (Tòng ngũ phẩm): 35 quan; rice: 30 kg; tax: 8 quan
 Sixth senior rank (Chánh lục phẩm): 30 quan; rice: 25 kg; tax: 7 quan
 Sixth junior rank (Tòng lục phẩm): 30 quan; rice: 22 kg; tax: 6 quan
 Seventh senior rank (Chánh thất phẩm): 25 quan; rice: 20 kg; tax: 5 quan
 Seventh junior rank (Tòng thất phẩm): 22 quan; rice: 20 kg; tax: 5 quan
 Eighth senior rank (Chánh bát phẩm): 20 quan; rice: 18 kg; tax: 5 quan
 Eighth junior rank (Tòng bát phẩm): 20 quan; rice: 18 kg; tax: 4 quan
 Ninth senior rank (Chánh cửu phẩm): 18 quan; rice: 16 kg; tax: 4 quan
 Ninth junior rank (Tòng cửu phẩm): 18 quan; rice: 16 kg; tax: 4 quan

Political organization

Education system

Colonial education

Pension 

When mandarins retired, they could receive one hundred to four hundred quan from the emperor. When they died, the imperial court provided twenty to two hundred quan for a funeral.

Administrative divisions

Under Gia Long 

During the reign of Gia Long, the kingdom was divided into twenty-three quasi-militant protectorates trấn and four military departments doanh. Each protectorate, besides having their own separated regional governments, was under patrol of one greater, powerful unit called Overlord of Citadel, or the Viceroy. For examples, the northern protectorates had Bắc thành Tổng trấn (Viceroy of Northern Protectorates) in Hanoi, and southern protectorates had Gia Định thành Tổng trấn (Viceroy of Gia Định Protectorates) resides in Saigon. Two famously viceroys during Gia Long's reign were Nguyễn Văn Thành (Hanoi) and Lê Văn Duyệt (Saigon). By 1802, these were:
 16 protectorates under joint-governance from the Viceroys.

 Sơn Nam Thượng (Hanoi)
 Sơn Nam Hạ (Nam Định)
 Sơn Tây 
 Kinh Bắc (Bắc Ninh)
 Hải Dương
 Tuyên Quang
 Hưng Hoá
 Cao Bằng
 Lạng Sơn
 Thái Nguyên
 Quảng Yên
 Gia Định  or Phiên An
 Biên Hoà
 Vĩnh Thanh (later became Vĩnh Long and An Giang
 Định Tường (Tiền Giang)
 Hà Tiên

 7 Central protectorates

 Thanh Hoá
 Nghệ An
 Quảng Nghĩa (Quảng Ngãi)
 Bình Định
 Phú Yên
 Bình Hoà (Khánh Hoà)
 Bình Thuận

 4 departments surrounding Huế, directly ruled by Gia Long.
 Quảng Đức
 Quảng Bình
 Quảng Trị
 Quảng Nam

Minh Mạng and later 

In 1831, Minh Mạng reorganised his kingdom by converting all these protectorates into 31 provinces (tỉnh). Each province had a series of smaller jurisdictions: the prefecture (phủ), the subprefecture (châu, in areas whereas having a significant population of ethnic minorities). Under prefecture and subprefecture, there was the district (huyện), the canton (tổng). Under district and canton, the bundle of hamlets around one common religious temple or social factor point, the village (làng or the commune xã) was the lowest administrative unit, which one respected person nominally took care of village administrative, which called lý trưởng.

Two nearby provinces were combined into a pair. Every pair had a governor-general (Tổng đốc) and a governor (Tuần phủ). Frequently, there were twelve governor-generals and eleven governors, although, in some periods, the Emperor would appoint a "commissioner in charge of patrolled borderlands" (kinh lược sứ) that supervising entire northern of the southern part of the kingdom. In 1803, Vietnam had 57 prefectures, 41 subprefectures, 201 districts, 4,136 cantons and 16,452 villages, and then by 1840s its had been increased to 72 prefectures, 39 subprefectures and 283 districts, which an average 30,000 people per district. Cambodia had been absorbed into the Vietnamese administrative system, bore the name Tây Thành Province from 1834 to 1845. With areas having minority groups like Tày, Nùng, Mèo (Hmong people), Mường, Mang and Jarai, the Huế court imposed the co-existing tributary and quasi-bureaucratic governance system, while allowing these people to have their own local rulers and autonomy.

In 1832, there were:
 Three regions and 31 provinces (encompassed modern-day Vietnam):

 Bắc Kỳ (Tonkin)
 Hanoi
 Lạng Sơn
 Cao Bằng
 Bắc Ninh
 Thái Nguyên
 Nam Định
 Hưng Yên
 Sơn Tây
 Hưng Hoá
 Tuyên Quang
 Hải Dương
 Quảng Yên
 Ninh Bình
 Trung Kỳ (Annam)
 Thanh Hoá
 Nghệ An
 Hà Tĩnh
 Quảng Bình
 Quảng Trị
 Thừa Thiên
 Quảng Nam
 Quảng Ngãi
 Bình Định
 Phú Yên
 Khánh Hoà
 Bình Thuận
 Nam Kỳ (Cochinchina)
 Biên Hoà
 Gia Định
 Vĩnh Long
 Định Tường
 An Giang
 Hà Tiên

 Client/dependent territories:
 Luang Phrabang
 Vientine
 Cambodia 
 Jarai chiefdoms

 Chief cities:
 Huế, capital city, population (1880): 30,000
 Hanoi, major city, population (1880): 120,000
 Saigon, major city, population (1880): 100,000

Economy

Society

Culture and Cultural Discrimination 
The Nguyễn dynasty viewed cultures that were "non-Chinese" as barbaric and called themselves the Central Kingdom (Trung Quốc, 中國). This includes the Han Chinese under the Qing dynasty who were viewed as "non-Chinese". As the Qing have caused the Chinese to not be "Han" anymore. Chinese were referred to as "Thanh nhân" (清人). This occurred after Vietnam had sent a delegate to Beijing, whereupon a diplomatic disaster caused Vietnam to view other "non-Chinese" as barbaric in much the same way as the Qing. By the Nguyễn dynasty the Vietnamese themselves were ordering Cambodian Khmer to adopt Vietnamese culture by ceasing "barbarous" habits like cropping hair and ordering them to grow it long besides making them replace skirts with trousers. Han Chinese Ming dynasty refugees numbering 3,000 came to Vietnam at the end of the Ming dynasty. They opposed the Qing dynasty and were fiercely loyal to the Ming dynasty. Vietnamese women married these Han Chinese refugees since most of them were soldiers and single men. They did not wear Manchu hairstyle unlike later Chinese migrants to Vietnam during the Qing dynasty.

Vietnamisation of ethnic minorities 

Under emperor Minh Mạng sinicisation of ethnic minorities became state policy. He claimed the legacy of Confucianism and China's Han dynasty for Vietnam, and used the term "Han people" (漢人, Hán nhân) to refer to the Vietnamese. According to the emperor, "We must hope that their barbarian habits will be subconsciously dissipated, and that they will daily become more infected by Han [Sino-Vietnamese] customs." These policies were directed at the Khmer and hill tribes. Nguyễn Phúc Chu had referred to the Vietnamese as "Han people" in 1712, distinguishing them from the Chams. The Nguyễn lords established colonies after 1790. Gia Long said, "Hán di hữu hạn" (漢 夷 有 限, "The Vietnamese and the barbarians must have clear borders"), distinguishing the Khmer from the Vietnamese. Minh Mang implemented an acculturation policy for minority non-Vietnamese peoples. "Thanh nhân" (清人 referring to the Qing dynasty) or "Đường nhân" (唐人 referring to the Tang dynasty) were used to refer to ethnic Chinese by the Vietnamese, who called themselves "Hán dân" (漢民) and "Hán nhân" (漢人 referring to the Han dynasty) during 19th-century Nguyễn rule. Since 1827, descendants of Ming dynasty refugees were called Minh nhân (明人) or Minh Hương (明 鄉) by Nguyễn rulers, to distinguish with ethnic Chinese. Minh nhân were treated as Vietnamese since 1829. They were not allowed to go to China, and also not allowed to wear the Manchu queue.

Costume 

The Nguyễn dynasty popularized Qing-influenced clothing. Trousers were adopted by female White H'mong speakers, replacing their traditional skirts. The Qing-influenced tunics and trousers were worn by the Vietnamese. The áo dài was developed in the 1920s, when compact, close-fitting tucks were added to predecessor of the áo dài, áo ngũ thân. Chinese-influenced trousers and tunics were ordered by lord Nguyễn Phúc Khoát during the 18th century, replacing traditional Vietnamese áo tràng vạt dervied from Chinese Jiaoling youren (Chinese: 交領右衽). Although the Chinese-influenced trousers and tunic were mandated by the Nguyen government, skirts were worn in isolated north Vietnamese hamlets until the 1920s. Chinese style clothing was ordered for the Vietnamese military and bureaucrats by Nguyễn Phúc Khoát.

An 1841 polemic, "On Distinguishing Barbarians", was based on the Qing sign "Vietnamese Barbarians' Hostel" (越夷會館) on the Fujian residence of Nguyen diplomat and Hoa Chinese Lý Văn Phức. It argued that the Qing did not subscribe to the neo-Confucianist texts from the Song and Ming dynasties which were learned by the Vietnamese, who saw themselves as sharing a civilization with the Qing. This event triggered a diplomatic disaster. The consequence was that non-"Han Chinese highland tribes" and other non-Vietnamese peoples living near (or in) Vietnam were called "barbarian" by the Vietnamese imperial court. The essay distinguishes the Yi and Hua, and mentions Zhao Tuo, Wen, Shun and Taibo. Kelley and Woodside described Vietnam's Confucianism.

Emperors Minh Mạng, Thiệu Trị and Tự Đức, were opposed to French involvement in Vietnam, and tried to reduce the country's growing Catholic community. The imprisonment of missionaries who had illegally entered the country was the primary pretext for the French to invade (and occupy) Indochina. Like Qing China, a number of incidents involved other European nations during the 19th century.

Religion 
Although the previous Nguyễn lords were faithful Buddhists, Gia Long was not a Buddhist. He adopted Neo-Confucianism and actively restricted Buddhism. Scholars, elites, and officials attacked Buddhist doctrines and criticized them as superstitious and useless. The third emperor, Thiệu Trị, elevated Confucianism as the true religion and while regarding Buddhism as superstition.

Building new Buddhist pagodas and temples were forbidden. Buddhist clergies and nuns were forced to join public works in order to limit the influence of Buddhism and promote Confucianism as the sole dominant belief of the society. However, such embracing a Sinic Confucian culture among the Vietnamese populace whom lived amidst a Southeast Asian infrastructure, widening the distance between the population and the court far away. Buddhism is still prevalence in the mainstream society and had its presence within the imperial palace. Empress mother, queens, princess, and concubines were devout Buddhists, despite the patriarchy prohibition.

Confucianism itself was the ideology of the Nguyen court, also provided the basic core of classical education and civil examination every year. Gia Long pursued Confucianism to create and maintain a conservative society and social structures. Confucian rituals and ideas were circulations based within ancient Confucian teaching such as The Analects and Spring and Autumn Annals in Vietnamese-script collections. The court rigidly imported these Chinese books from Chinese merchants. Confucian rituals such as cầu đảo (offering heaven for wind and rain during a drought) that the emperor and court officials perform for wishing heaven to rain down his kingdom. If the offer went successful, they had to conduct lễ tạ (thanksgiving ritual) to heaven. In addition, the emperor believed that holy spirits and natural goddesses of his country can also make rain. In 1804, Gia Long built the Nam Hải Long Vương Temple (Temple of Southern Ocean Dragon King) in Thuận An, northeast of Hue in his faithfulness to the spirit of Thuận An (Thần Thuận An), the place where most of cầu đảo ritual was performed. His successor, Minh Mạng, continued to build several temples dedicated to the Vũ Sư (rainmaking goddess) and altars for Thần Mây (Cloud Goddess) and Thần Sấm (Thunder Goddess).Nguyễn Trường Tộ, a prominent Catholic and reformist intellectual, launched an attack on Confucian structures in 1867 as decadent. He wrote to Tự Đức: "the evil that has been brought on China and on our country by the Confucian way of life." He criticized the court's Confucian education as dogmatic and unrealistic, promoted for his education reform.

During Gia Long's years, Catholicism was peacefully worshipped without any restriction. Began with Minh Mạng, who considered Christianity as a heterodox religion for its rejection of ancestor worship, the important belief of the Vietnamese monarchy. After reading the Bible (Old and New Testament), he considered the Christianity religion irrational and ridiculous, and praised Tokugawa Japan for its notorious policies on Christians. Minh Mạng also was influenced by anti-Christian propaganda written by Vietnamese Confucian officials and literati, which described the mixing of men and women and liberal society among the Church. The most thing he worried about Christianity and Catholicism was writing texts that proved that Christianity was a means for Europeans to take over foreign countries. He also praised the anti-Christian policy in Japan. Churches were destroyed and many Christians were imprisoned. The persecution got intense during the reign of his grandson Tự Đức, when most of the state efforts were to annihilate Vietnamese Christianity. Unironically, even during the height of the anti-Catholic campaign, many Catholic scholars were still permitted to hold high positions in the imperial court.

After an imperial edict in late 1862, Catholicism was officially recognized and worshippers of the faith obtained state protection. It is estimated that late-19th century Vietnam had about 600,000 to 700,000 Catholic Christians.

Demography 
Before the French conquest, the Vietnamese population was very sparse due to the agricultural backbones economy of the country. The population in 1802 was 6.5 million people and had only grown to 8 million by 1840. Rapid industrialization after the 1860s ushered in massive population growth and rapid urbanization in the late 19th century. Many peasants left tenant farms and poured into cities, they were hired by French-owned factories. By 1880 the Vietnamese were estimated back then as high as 18 million people, while modern estimates by Angus Maddison have suggested a lower figure of 12.2 million people. Vietnam under the Nguyễn dynasty was always a multiethnic complex. Nearly 80% percent of the Empire's population were ethnic Vietnamese (called Annamites then), whom language belonged to the Mon-Khmer (Mon—Annamite then) stock, and the rest were Cham, Chinese, Khmer, Mường, Tày (called Thô then), and other 50 ethnic minorities such as the Mang, Jarai, Yao.

The Annamites are distributed across the lowland of the country from Tonkin to Cochichina. The Chams live in central Vietnam and the Mekong Delta. The Chinese particularly concentrated in urbanised areas such as Saigon, Chợ Lớn, and Hanoi. The Chinese tended to be divided into two groups called Minh Hương (明鄉) and Thanh nhân (清人). The Minh Hương were Chinese refugees that had migrated and settled down in Vietnam earlier during the 17th century, who married with Vietnamese women, had been substantially assimilated to local Vietnamese and Khmer populaces, and loyal to the Nguyen, compared to the Thanh nhân that recently arrived in Southern Vietnam, dominated the rice trade. During the reign of Minh Mạng, a restriction against the Thanh nhân was issued in 1827, Thanh nhân could not access to the state bureaucracy and had to be integrated into Vietnamese population like the Minh Hương.

The Mường people inhabited on the hills west of the Red River Delta, although subordinate to the central authority, they were also permitted to bear arms, a privilege not accorded to any other subjects of the court of Huế. The Tày and the Mang live in the northern highlands of Tonkin, both submitted to Huế court along with taxes and tribute, but are allowed to have their hereditary chiefs.

Photography 

The first photographs of Vietnam were taken by Jules Itier in Danang, in 1845. The first photos of the Vietnamese were taken by Fedor Jagor in November 1857 in Singapore. Due to the forbidden contact to foreigners, photography returned to Vietnam again during the French conquest and had shots taken by Paul Berranger during the French invasion of Da Nang (September 1858). Since the French seizure of Saigon in 1859, the city and southern Vietnam had been opening to foreigners, and photography entered Vietnam exclusively from France and Europe.

Military

Gallery

Imperial family 

The House of Nguyễn Phúc (Nguyen Gia Mieu) had historically been founded in the 14th century in Gia Miêu village, Thanh Hóa Province, before they came to rule southern Vietnam from 1558 to 1777, then became the ruling dynasty of the entire Vietnam. Traditionally, the family traces themselves to Nguyễn Bặc (?–979), the first duke of Đại Việt. Princes and male descendants of Gia Long are called Hoàng Thân, while male lineal descendants of previous Nguyen lords are named Tôn Thất. Grandsons of the emperor were Hoàng tôn. Daughters of the emperor were called Hoàng nữ, and always earned the title công chúa (princess).

Their succession practically is according to the law of primogeniture, but sometimes conflicted. The first succession conflict arose in 1816 when Gia Long was designing for an heir. His first prince Nguyễn Phúc Cảnh died in 1802. As a result, two rival factions emerged, one support Nguyễn Phúc Mỹ Đường, the eldest son of Prince Cảnh, as the crown prince, while other support Prince Đảm (later Minh Mang). The second conflict was the 1847 succession when two young princes Nguyễn Phúc Hồng Bảo and Hồng Nhậm were dragged by the ill-failing Emperor Thiệu Trị as a potential heir. At first, Thiệu Trị apparently chose Prince Hồng Bảo because he was older, but after hearing advice from two regents Trương Đăng Quế and Nguyễn Tri Phương, he revised the heir at last minute and choose Hồng Nhậm as the crown prince.

Emperors 

The following list is the emperors' era names, which have meaning in Chinese and Vietnamese. For example, the first ruler's era name, Gia Long, is the combination of the old names for Saigon (Gia Định) and Hanoi (Thăng Long) to show the new unity of the country; the fourth, Tự Đức, means "Inheritance of Virtues"; the ninth, Đồng Khánh, means "Collective Celebration".

After the death of Emperor Tự Đức (and according to his will), Dục Đức ascended to the throne on 19 July 1883. He was dethroned and imprisoned three days later, after being accused of deleting a paragraph from Tự Đức's will. With no time to announce his dynastic title, his era name was named for his residential palace.

Lineage 

Note:
 Years are reigning years.

Family tree 
Simplified family tree of the Nguyen Phuc dynasty:

 - Lords of Cochinchina (1550s–1777)
 - Emperors of the independent Vietnamese monarchy (1802–1883)
 - Emperors of French Annam and Tonkin/Emperor of Empire of Vietnam (1885–1945)

Succession line 

 Thiệu Trị (1801-1847)

 Tự Đức (1829-1883)
 Kiên Thái Vương (1845-1876)
  Đồng Khánh (1864-1889)
 Khải Định (1885-1925)
 Bảo Đại (1913-1997)
Crown Prince Bảo Long (1936-2007)
Prince Bảo Thắng (1943-2017)
  Kiến Phúc (1869-1884)
  Hàm Nghi (1871-1944)
   (1910-1990)

Symbols

Flags 

The Nguyễn dynasty's national flag or the Imperial flag first appeared during the reign of Gia Long. It was a yellow flag with a single or three horizontal red stripes, sometimes in 1822, it was entirely blank yellow or white. The emperor's personal flag was a golden dragon spitting fire, surrounded by clouds, a silver moon, and a black crescent on a yellow background.

Seals 

The Nguyễn dynasty's seal are rich and diverse in types and had strict rules and laws that regulated their manipulation, management, and use. The common practice of using seals was clearly recorded in the book "Khâm định Đại Nam hội điển sự lệ" on how to use seals, how to place them, and on what kinds of documents, which was compiled by the Cabinet of the Nguyễn dynasty in the year Minh Mạng 3 (1822). The various types of seals of the Nguyễn dynasty had different names based on their function, namely Bảo (寶), Tỷ (璽), Ấn (印), Chương (章), Ấn chương (印章), Kim bảo tỷ (金寶璽), Quan phòng (關防), Đồ ký (圖記), Kiềm ký (鈐記), Tín ký (信記), Ấn Ký (印記), Trưởng ký (長記), and Ký (記).

Seals in the Nguyễn dynasty were overseen by a pair of agencies referred to as the Office of Ministry Seals Management - Officers on Duty (印司 - 直處, Ấn ty - Trực xứ), this is a term that refers to two agencies which were established within each of the Six Ministries, these agencies were tasked with keeping track of the seals, files, and chapters of their ministry. On duty of the Office of Ministry Seals Management were the correspondents of each individual ministry that received and distributed documents and records of a government agency. These two agencies usually had a few dozen officers who would import documents from their ministry. Usually the name of the ministry is directly attached to the seal agency's name, for example "Office of Civil Affairs Ministry Seals Management - Civil Affairs Ministry Officers on Duty" (吏印司吏直處, Lại Ấn ty Lại Trực xứ).

Since the Nguyễn dynasty period seals have a fairly uniform shape (with or without a handle), the uniform description of these seals in Vietnamese are:

 Thân ấn - The geometric block, or body, of the seal.
 Núm ấn - The handle for pressing the seal down on texts. In case the seal is shaped like a pyramid, there is no knob.
 Mặt ấn - Where the main content of the seal (symbol or word) is engraved, this area is usually in the face down position. The stamp surface is often used up to engrave letters or drawings.
 Lưng ấn - The face of the seal, where other information about the seal is engraved, usually in the supine position. In the case of the flat-head pyramid seal (ấn triện hình tháp đầu bằng), the flat head is the back.
 Hình ấn - A word used to indicate the impression of the seal on a text.

Seals were also given to people after they received a noble title. For example, after Léon Louis Sogny received the title of "Baron of An Bình" (安平男) in the year Bảo Đại 14 (保大拾肆年, 1939) he was also given a golden seal and a Kim Bài (金牌) with his noble title on it. The seal had the seal script inscription An Bình Nam chi ấn (安平男之印).

In its 143 years of existence, the government of the Nguyễn dynasty had created more than 100 imperial seals. These imperial seals were made of jade, bronze, silver, gold, ivory, and meteorite.

Sun, moon, auspicious clouds, and the Yin-Yang symbol 

Like Imperial China and Royal Korea, the Vietnamese used the sun as the "Symbol of the Empire" and auspicious clouds and the Taijitu as "Symbols of the State". The heraldic systems of both the Later Lê and Nguyễn dynasties were similar to those found in China during the Ming and Qing dynasties. The sun symbol as a flaming disc in Vietnam dates back to the 11th century and during the Nguyễn dynasty period this symbol was often depicted with pointed rays. The moon symbolised the state, the sun the empire, stars the sovereigns, and clouds the heaven.

The "Achievement of the Empire" and the "Achievement of the State" were identical to their Imperial Chinese counterparts, the "Achievement of the Empire" first appeared in Vietnam during the 11th century and were identical during the Later Lê and Nguyễn periods consisting of two Dragons surrounding a flaming sun, while the "Achievement of the State" is known to have been as used as early as the Trần dynasty period and this early Trần version consists of two Dragons surrounding a lotus flower (a symbol of Buddhism). During the Nguyễn dynasty period the "Achievement of the State" typically consisted of two dragons surrounding a moon or two dragons surrounding a Taijitu, this symbol was commonly found on the caps of high-ranking mandarins. The two dragons surrounding the moon implies that the emperor, or "sovereign", (represented by the dragons) was also the head of state (represented by either the moon or a Yin-Yang symbol). During the period of French domination (法屬, Pháp thuộc) these symbols could be interpreted as the French National Assembly (that is: the French people) was the sovereign over the Empire (the dragons), the Nguyễn Emperor now merely being the head of state (moon or Yin-Yang symbol). Moons also appeared on the shields of common Nguyễn dynasty soldiers representing the state, while soldiers of the imperial guards sometimes had shields depicting a red sun showcasing that they were a function of the empire.

Dragons 

Dragon motifs appeared on many state symbols during the Nguyễn dynasty period including on imperial edicts, coins, buildings, and the badges of the Imperial Guard. During the Minh Mạng period (1820–1841) dragons on silver Tiền coins were often depicted facing dexter (to the right), while during the Thiệu Trị period (1841–1847) and later these coins depicted dragons guardant (facing forwards). Dragons were considered to be one of the four sacred animals together with the Phượng hoàng (Phoenix), Kỳ lân (Unicorn), and the Linh quy (Sacred turtle). During the Nguyễn dynasty period the depiction of dragons in Vietnamese art reached their zenith and the quality and variety of Nguyễn dynasty dragons was much higher than those of earlier dynasties.

In the third month of the year Bính Tý, or Gia Long 15 (1816), Emperor Gia Long instructed the court to create special clothes, hats, and seals for himself and the crown prince to denote independence from China. These regalia all depicted five-clawed dragons (蠪𠄼𤔻, rồng 5 móng), in Chinese symbolism (including Vietnamese symbolism) five-clawed dragons are symbols of an Emperor, while four-clawed dragons are seen as symbols or kings. To denote the high status of Emperor all monarchial robes, hats, and seals were adorned with five-clawed dragons and ordered the creation of new seals with five-clawed dragons as their seal knobs to showcase imperial legitimacy. Meanwhile, the wardrobes and other symbols of vassals and princes were adorned with four-clawed dragons symbolising their status as "kings".

The two national coats of arms of the French protectorate of Annam would also consist of golden dragons with one being a sword per fess charged with a scroll inscribed with two Traditional Chinese characters Đại Nam (大南) and supported by a single Vietnamese dragon and the other being a golden five-clawed dragon positioned affronté.

Gallery of symbols

See also 

 List of monarchs of Vietnam
 Nguyễn Trường Tộ – served Emperor Tự Đức

Notes

References

Sources

Books

Articles

External links 

 homepage of The Nguyễn Dynasty

States and territories established in 1802
 
1945 disestablishments in Vietnam
 
Vietnam, Nguyen Dynasty
Vietnamese independence movement
Former countries in Vietnamese history
Vietnamese dynasties
1802 establishments in Vietnam
Former countries of the interwar period